The 2021–22 TCU Horned Frogs women's basketball team represented Texas Christian University in the 2021–22 NCAA Division I women's basketball season. The 2021–22 season is head coach Raegan Pebley's eighth season at TCU. The Horned Frogs were members of the Big 12 Conference and played their home games in Schollmaier Arena.

The Horned Frogs finished the season 6–22, 2–16 in Big 12 play to finish in tenth place.  In the Big 12 Tournament, they lost to West Virignia in the First Round.  They were not invited to the NCAA tournament or the WNIT.

Previous season
The Horned Frogs finished the season 10–15, 4–14 in Big 12 play to finish in eight place.  In the Big 12 Tournament, they defeated Kansas in the first round, before losing to eventual champion Baylor in the Quarterfinals.  They were not invited to the NCAA tournament or the WNIT.

Roster

Schedule and results 

Source:

|-
!colspan=6 style=| Non-Conference Regular season

|-
!colspan=6 style=| Big 12 Regular season

|-
!colspan=6 style=| Big 12 Women's Tournament

Rankings

The Coaches Poll did not release a Week 2 poll and the AP Poll did not release a poll after the NCAA Tournament.

References 

TCU
TCU Horned Frogs women's basketball seasons
TCU
TCU